Con el Corazón en la Mano is the debut studio album by Colombian band Aterciopelados. It was released in 1993 and its influences are from punk rock music to Colombian folk music, the band wanted to mix styles to have a unique identity and create a unique type of music taking into consideration their local and global influences. From this album, "Mujer Gala", "Sortilegio" and "La Cuchilla" (a popular culture Colombian song) are the most known.

In this first album, the members were Andrés Giraldo, Charly Márquez, Andrea Echeverri and Héctor Buitrago.

Track listing

References

External links

1993 albums
Aterciopelados albums